Section Eight Productions, or just Section Eight, was an American film production company founded in 2000 by film director Steven Soderbergh and actor/director George Clooney. It produced the critical hits Far from Heaven, Insomnia, Syriana, A Scanner Darkly and Michael Clayton, as well as Clooney-directed films Confessions of a Dangerous Mind and Good Night, and Good Luck. In 2005, Syriana and Good Night, and Good Luck picked up eight Oscars nominations between them. With Soderbergh citing a desire to focus on directing, and Clooney forming production company Smokehouse Pictures with Grant Heslov, the two decided to shut down Section Eight at the end of 2006.

Films

Notes and references

External links 
New York Times, January 18, 2005: Trying to Combine Art and Box Office in Hollywood — article about Section Eight, Clooney, & Soderbergh.

Entertainment companies established in 2000
Mass media companies established in 2000
Mass media companies disestablished in 2006
Defunct American film studios
Film production companies of the United States
Entertainment companies based in California
2000 establishments in California
2006 disestablishments in California